Charlie Depthios (2 February 1940 – 4 September 1999) was an Indonesian weightlifter. He competed at the 1968 Summer Olympics and the 1972 Summer Olympics.

His son Enosh Depthios is also an Olympic weightlifter.

References

External links
 

1940 births
1999 deaths
Indonesian male weightlifters
Olympic weightlifters of Indonesia
Weightlifters at the 1968 Summer Olympics
Weightlifters at the 1972 Summer Olympics
Sportspeople from West Sulawesi
20th-century Indonesian people